Godman's rock-wallaby (Petrogale godmani) is a diprotodont marsupial, and a typical rock-wallaby. It is found in northern and north-eastern Queensland, Australia. This rock-wallaby is found in low open forest, open scrub, or montane regions, often near the coast. It shelters in rocky terrain adjacent to feeding areas. Godman's rock-wallaby is a nocturnal gregarious territorial folivore.

References

Cited references

General references

Australian Government, Department of the Environment and Heritage, Australian Biological Resources study

Macropods
Mammals of Queensland
Marsupials of Australia
Mammals described in 1923
Taxa named by Oldfield Thomas